Yury Vyacheslavovich Molchanov (born July 19, 1952, in Kolomna, Moscow Oblast, Soviet Union) is a Russian  businessman and politician.

Career 
From 1987 to 1999, he was the Deputy Rector of Saint Petersburg State University (LSU). In 1990, he as vice rector for international affairs of LSU which is a post for plain clothes KGB and Vladimir Putin as Molchanov's assistant which, according to Oleg Kalugin, is a post for the KGB rezident formed a Joint Venture between Procter & Gamble (P&G) with a 99% share and LSU with a 1% share allowing P&G to locate in a mansion on Universitetskaya Embankment in the Rector's wing in the same place as the international department. Of course, both Putin and Molchanov received American soap, washing detergent, and money from P&G. Since 2004 he has been the Deputy Governor of Saint Petersburg.

As of 2017, he owns the Ostrov shopping and office complex on 36/40 Sredniy Prospekt Vasilyevsky Island in St. Petersburg.

He is the adoptive father of the Andrey Molchanov, the Russian billionaire who owns LSR Group, one of Russia's largest construction firms.

Notes

References

External links 
Biography (in Russian)

Russian politicians
Russian businesspeople in real estate
Living people
1952 births
People from Kolomna